The 2010–11 Primera Catalana was the 20th season of Primera Catalana, the 5th tier of the Spanish football league system and the highest league of the autonomous community of Catalonia. The top three were promoted to Tercera División, and the bottom two were relegated to the Segona Catalana.

Primera Catalana

A total of 20 teams will contest the league, including 3 relegated from the Tercera División and 3 promoted from the Preferent Territorial.

Promotion and relegation
Teams relegated from 2009–10 Tercera División
 UE Rapitenca
 CD Blanes
 CF Olesa de Montserrat
Teams promoted from 2009–10 Preferent Territorial
 Olímpic Can Fatjó
 UEC Vic
 UE Olot

League table

Results

Locations

External links
 FCF Site

Primera Catalana
5
1